Paul Chen may refer to:
Western name of Chen Chao-Po (b. 1955), founder of Dalian Hanwei Metal Co. Ltd.
Paul Chen (businessman), Canadian software businessman
Paolo Gumabao, (b. 1998 as Paul Chen), actor and model based in the Philippines

See also
Chen (surname)